Dean Spanley is a 2008 British comedy drama film, with fantastic elements, directed by Fijian New Zealander Toa Fraser. Set in Edwardian England, the film is based on an Alan Sharp adaptation of Irish author Lord Dunsany's 1936 novella My Talks with Dean Spanley. It stars Sam Neill as the Dean, Jeremy Northam and Peter O'Toole as Fisk Junior and Fisk Senior respectively and Bryan Brown as Wrather.

Plot
The narrative is called "a surreal period comedic tale of canine reincarnation exploring the relationships between father and son and master and dog". Peter O'Toole said that the film's use of comedy to explore the relationship between a father and son was part of the attraction for him: "All of us have had these difficult familial relationships and I think it's a film for all of us who understand the relationship between a father and son. It's been interesting watching how various members of the crew have been looking at the monitors during scenes, because they come up to me and say, 'I had the same thing with my father.'"

Storyline
In the very early 1900s, Henslowe Fisk lives beholden to his father, the difficult Horatio Fisk. The Fisk family has suffered first the loss of its younger son, Harrington Fisk (Xavier Horan), killed in the Second Anglo-Boer War, shortly followed by the death of Horatio's wife. Fisk Senior is looked after by his housekeeper Mrs Brimley (Judy Parfitt) who has lost her husband. Fisk Junior reluctantly visits his father every Thursday.

One day, trying to entertain his father, Fisk Junior takes him to a lecture by a visiting swami (Art Malik) about the transmigration of souls. The lecture is also attended by the new local clergyman, Dean Spanley (Sam Neill).

Later the same day Fisk Junior encounters the Dean at his father's club. A chance third meeting leads to an introduction. Fisk Junior, initially intrigued by the Dean's oddly open-minded views on reincarnation, is prompted to look beyond the Dean's appearance (that of an affable, rather bland clergyman) by his weakness for certain peculiar sensations produced by Hungarian Imperial Tokay wine, which leads him into a dreamlike state. Working with his clever friend Wrather (Bryan Brown), an Australian "conveyancer", Fisk secures a batch of Tokay and the two entertain the Dean, who acts ever more strangely, starting to reveal memories of his previous life — as a Welsh Spaniel. These memories are acute and convincing, including rich feelings around food and communication with other canines, a deep distaste for cats and pigs, and the joy of serving his master. As the story unfolds, Fisk Junior comes to understand his father's background better and the two draw closer. There is a sub-plot concerning Fisk Senior's childhood that receives an unexpected resolution forming the climax of the story.

Cast

 Jeremy Northam as Fisk Junior (Henslowe)
 Sam Neill as Dean Spanley
 Bryan Brown as J.J. Wrather
 Peter O'Toole as Fisk Senior (Horatio)
 Judy Parfitt as Mrs Brimley
 Art Malik as Swami Nala Prash
 Ramon Tikaram as the Nawab of Ranjiput
 Xavier Horan as Harrington Fisk 
 Barbara Wilshere as 1st lady
 Angela Clerkin as 2nd lady
 Dudley Sutton as Marriott
 Shaughan Seymour as wine shop proprietor
 Charlotte Graham as woman in cloisters
 Hayden Downing as boy in cloisters
 Miriama McDowell as foxy lady
 Bruce Hopkins as shepherd
 Elizabeth Goram-Smith as a young lady of stature (uncredited)
 Nick Shaw as Man of stature (uncredited)

Production

Optioning
The novella was optioned from the Dunsany Will Trust through Curtis Brown of London by Alan Sharp.  Support for the production came from both English (Screen East) and New Zealand (NZ Film Commission) government agencies, with financing completed by Aramid Entertainment, General Film Corporation and Lipsync Productions. Both producers, the director, some of the lead cast (Neill was born in Northern Ireland but grew up in New Zealand, where he still lives), the cinematographer, the editor, the composer and a number of other members of the production crew and cast are from New Zealand.

Writing
The adapted screenplay was written by Alan Sharp, with clearance from the Dunsany Literary Estate. Trevor Johnston has written, "If you read the original story before seeing the film ..., then see the film, what’s striking is that Sharp has not so much effected an adaptation as a reinvention."

Locations
Principal filming began at Wisbech in Cambridgeshire (including Wisbech Castle and Peckover House) on 10 November 2007, continuing for some weeks and taking in the heritage area of the Crescent, the Castle and the museum. It continued at Holkham Hall in Norfolk and Elveden Hall in Suffolk, once home to and remodelled for the last Maharajah of Punjab in the years just before the film's setting. Elm Hill in Norwich and the cloisters at Norwich Cathedral were also used.  Further filming took place in New Zealand.

Technology
The movie was shot on 16 mm film and digitally, in 1:1.85 ratio, using Arri 416 and D-20 cameras, with digital intermediate post-production by Lipsync Productions.

Music
An original soundtrack was composed by New Zealand composer Don McGlashan. A soundtrack CD was released in New Zealand on Warner Music (NZ) 5186531802 consisting of 14 tracks and a running time of 41:05. 
Background choir music was provided by the 30-voice New Zealand choir Musica Sacra.

Release and reception
Ahead of general release, Dean Spanley was shown twice at the 2008 Toronto International Film Festival, where it received a red-carpet gala premiere, the first New Zealand production ever to do so.
It also had two showings at the London Film Festival, and was also shown at the largest film festival in Asia, the Pusan International.

The United Kingdom general release  was announced by Icon Distribution for 12 December, and a "U" classification issued by the British Board of Film Classification.
In Ireland it was certified "G" and was released on the same date. The film was certified in Australia as "G" also, and was released 5 March 2009, and in New Zealand 26 February 2009; distribution in both Australia and New Zealand was by Paramount.

In early November, the film was offered to United States distributors at the annual American Film Market (5–12 November), with two showings announced, and in early February 2009, Miramax bought the United States rights. However, rather than opening in theatres in the U.S., it went straight to cable.

A region-2 DVD was released in 2009. A region-1 DVD was released in 2010.

The novella, out of print for some years, was re-issued from HarperCollins in 2008. It included the film screenplay, set photos, publicity stills and interviews and comments from the cast, director, producers and crew members.

Critical response 

Receiving a standing ovation at the gala premiere, initial commentary was positive, with particular praise for O'Toole's performance and the final "act".

Reviews were generally positive, Rotten Tomatoes website gives the film a rating of 88% based on 32 reviews. The critical consensus describes the film as "Offbeat, whimsical, period-set shaggy dog story with daffy performances from Sam Neill and Peter O’Toole."

Dean Spanley was longlisted for the 2009 British Academy of Film and Television Arts awards for Adapted Screenplay (Alan Sharp) and Supporting Actor (Peter O'Toole).

References

External links
 
 Dean Spanley at the NZ Film Commission
 
 

2008 films
2000s fantasy comedy-drama films
Icon Productions films
British fantasy comedy-drama films
Films based on fantasy novels
Films based on Irish novels
Adaptations of works by Lord Dunsany
Films about reincarnation
Films set in England
Films set in the 1900s
2008 comedy films
2008 drama films
2000s English-language films
2000s British films